The 15th Annual Gotham Independent Film Awards, presented by the Independent Filmmaker Project, were held on November 30, 2005 and were hosted by Kyra Sedgwick. The nominees were announced on October 25, 2005.

Winners and nominees

Special awards

Celebrate New York Award
 Mad Hot Ballroom

Gotham Tributes
 Matt Dillon
 Jim Jarmusch

References

External links
 

2005
2005 film awards